Charles Cuvillier (24 April 1877 – 14 February 1955) was a French composer of operetta. He won his greatest successes with the operettas La reine s'amuse (1912, played as The Naughty Princess in London) and with The Lilac Domino, which became a hit in 1918 in London.

Biography
Cuvillier was born in Paris, and studied at the Paris Conservatoire with Gabriel Fauré and Jules Massenet. He began writing for the Paris musical stage and had a success with Avant-hier matin (1905), a small scale work with piano accompaniment. Later stage works to achieve success in France and abroad included Son p'tit frère (1907), his first collaboration with André Barde,  and La reine s'amuse (1912). The latter (also known as  La reine joyeuse) featured Cuvillier's biggest hit, "Ah! la troublante volupté". Before the First World War he made a career in Germany as well as France. The second of his two works written for German theatres, Flora Bella, was playing in Munich and had its run immediately brought to a stop when war was declared. Cuvillier fought in the trenches against Germany during the war, and thereafter made his career in France and the U.K.

Cuvillier was popular in England after the First World War. Avant-hier matin played with success in London as Wild Geese, and La reine joyeuse ran for 280 performances as The Naughty Princess. His greatest international success was the operetta The Lilac Domino, originally Der lila Domino (Leipzig, 1912). The critic Andrew Lamb writes that Cuvillier composed "light, insinuating music, distinguished by typically French phrasing."

Cuvillier died in Paris in 1955, at the age of 77.

Stage works 
1903: La Citoyenne Cotillon, comédie dramatique by Henri Cain and Ernest Daudet, incidental music by Cuvillier
1905: Avant-hier matin (libretto: Tristan Bernard), Paris, Théâtre des Capucines
1907: Le flirt de Colombine (Jaques Redelsperger), Nice
1907: Son p'tit frère (André Barde), Paris, Capucines; revised as Laïs, ou la courtisane amoureuse, 1929
1908: Les rendez-vous strasbourgeois (Romain Coolus), Paris, Comédie-Royale
1909: Afgar, ou Les loisirs andalous (Barde and Michel Carré, fils), Paris, Capucines
1910: La fausse ingénue, ou les Muscadines (Barde), Paris, Capucines
1912: Der lila Domino (Emmerich von Gatti and Bela Jenbach), Leipzig, Stadttheater
1912: Sapho (Barde and Carré), Paris, Capucines
1912: La reine s'amuse (Barde), Marseille, Variétés; revised as La reine joyeuse, Paris, Olympia, 1918
1912: L'Initiatrice (Robert Dieudonné and Hugues Delorme), Paris, Mayol
1913: Flora Bella, Munich, Staatstheater am Gärtnerplatz; French version (Barde): Florabella, Célestins, Lyon, 1921
1915: Judith courtisane, (Régis Gignoux), Paris, Théâtre Michel
1918: Mademoiselle Nom d'une pipe (Georges Duval, Paris, Palais Royal
1920: The Sunshine of the World (Gladys Unger after K.K. Ardashir), London, Empire
1920: Johnny Jones and his Sister Sue, (Harry M. Vernon), London, Alhambra
1922: Annabella (Maurice Magre), Paris, Théâtre Fémina
1922: Par amour (Magre), Paris, Paris, Femina
1922: Nonnette (Barde), Paris, Capucines
1924: Bob et moi (Barde, L. Meyrargue), Paris, Michel
1926: Qui êtes-vous? (H. Genty, Berr and Jouvault), Monte Carlo
1929: Laïs ou La Courtisane amoureuse (Barde) (see Son p'tit frère, 1907, above)
1929: Boulard et ses filles (Louis Verneuil, Saint-Granier, Jean le Seyeux), Paris, Théâtre Marigny
1935: Le Train de 8h47 (Georges Courteline, Lépold Marches, Barde), Paris, Palais Royale

Notes

External links
 

1877 births
1955 deaths
French male classical composers
French opera composers
French operetta composers
Male opera composers
Musicians from Paris